The Northwest Hockey League is a failed senior amateur ice hockey league that made an aborted attempt to operate during the 1975–76 season.

The league comprised seven teams:
Abbotsford Coppertones, (Abbotsford, British Columbia)
British Columbia Braves, (British Columbia)
Burnaby Lakers, (Burnaby, British Columbia
North Shore Hurry Kings, (Delta, British Columbia
Portland Buckaroos, (Portland, Oregon
Richmond Redwings, (Richmond, British Columbia)
Simon Fraser Clansmen, (British Columbia)

References

Defunct ice hockey leagues in Canada
Defunct ice hockey leagues in the United States
1975–76 in American ice hockey by league
1975–76 in Canadian ice hockey by league